Caetano Imparato (26 November 1898 – unknown), known as Imparatinho, was a Brazilian footballer who played for Palmeiras. He was capped once by the Brazil national football team in 1922, scoring two goals.

Career statistics

International

International goals
Scores and results list Brazil's goal tally first, score column indicates score after each Brazil goal.

References

1898 births
Date of death unknown
People from Sorocaba
Footballers from São Paulo
Brazilian footballers
Brazil international footballers
Association football forwards
Sociedade Esportiva Palmeiras players